Fritzi Scheff (born Friederike Scheff; August 30, 1879 – April 8, 1954) was an American actress and singer.

Biography
Born Friederike Scheff  in Vienna to Dr. Gottfried Scheff and Anna Yeager, she studied at the Hoch Conservatory in Frankfurt. She made her debut on January 10, 1897 in Nuremberg. She debuted in Munich at the Royal Opera House.

In 1901 she first appeared at the Metropolitan Opera House, New York, singing roles in La Bohème, Die Meistersinger, Die Walküre, and Don Giovanni.  She sang in the Victor Herbert operetta Babette at Washington, D.C. and New York (1903).

Toward the end of the 1904-05 season, Scheff became ill and was replaced by her understudy Ida Hawley to close out the remaining performances of Babette. Scheff had immense success as Fifi in Mlle. Modiste (1905–1908, 1913) and appeared also in The Prima Donna (1908), The Mikado (1910), The Duchess (1911), and The Love Wager (1912). From 1913-18, she appeared principally in vaudeville, returning in the latter year to the musical opera stage in Glorianna. Among the rôles she sang with the Fritzi Scheff Opera Company was that of Adele in Johann Strauss operatta Die Fledermaus including at the Belasco Theater in Washington, D.C. in 1912.

Movies and television
In 1915 Scheff appeared in her first film, Pretty Mrs. Smith, based on a Broadway play she starred in. It was to be her "vehicle", but critics were mostly negative about her performance and the film; instead, they were positive about Charlotte Greenwood. She made no other silent pictures. In the late 1940s and early 1950s Scheff ventured into sound movies and television. She appeared in night clubs, and died a month after being in Ralph Edwards' This Is Your Life.

Personal life and death
She married, first, Baron Fritz von Bardeleben a Prussian nobleman, then in 1908 John Fox, Jr. author of The Trail of the Lonesome Pine, and, in 1913, George Anderson, an actor. The unions were all childless.

Scheff died on April 8, 1954 in New York.

Notes

External links

Fritzi Scheff portrait gallery at NYP Library
Fritzi Scheff; PeriodPaper.com about 1910

1879 births
1954 deaths
19th-century Austrian actresses
20th-century American actresses
19th-century Austrian women opera singers
Austrian stage actresses
Austro-Hungarian emigrants to the United States
American stage actresses
American film actresses
American television actresses
American opera singers
Actresses from Vienna
Musicians from Vienna
Vaudeville performers
Burials at Kensico Cemetery
20th-century American women singers
20th-century American singers